The Lucid is an American hard rock group consisting of guitarist Drew Fortier (ex-Bang Tango), drummer Mike Heller (Malignancy, Raven, Fear Factory), bassist David Ellefson (ex-Megadeth) and vocalist Vinnie Dombroski (Sponge).

Background 
The band was formed in early 2020 with guitarist Drew Fortier and drummer Mike Heller demoing song ideas for a potential new project which led to Fortier's frequent collaborator and former Megadeth bassist David Ellefson joining the fold with Sponge vocalist Vinnie Dombroski following soon after to complete the line up. The four met in L.A. in July 2020 to finish recording what would eventually become their self-titled debut album The Lucid. The album was produced by Heller, and mixed and mastered by Lasse Lammert.

This is David Ellefson's first post Megadeth project after being let go from the band in May 2021.

In early September 2021, The Lucid released their first single "Maggot Wind" along with a release date of October 15 for their debut album. In late September 2021, the band released their second single "Damned", followed by their third single "Hair" in October.

The official music video for "Deaths of Despair" was released in January 2022; directed by Drew Fortier.

The band released their official music video for "Hair" in March 2022; it was directed by and stars Hannah Fierman (V/H/S, Siren).

A tour was announced for May 2022 consisting of 7 dates; they were later canceled due to guitarist Drew Fortier's cancer diagnosis.

The official music video for Maskronaut was released in June 2022 to help raise cancer awareness due to Fortier's diagnosis. The video was directed by Michael Sarna.

In December 2022, the "Saddle Up and Ride" single was released featuring guest vocals from Insane Clown Posse singer Violent J. The band announced the release of a 5 track E.P. titled Saddle Up and Ride with a release date of January 27, 2023.

Members 

 Drew Fortier - guitars (2020–present)
 Mike Heller - drums (2020–present)
 David Ellefson - bass (2020–present)
 Vinnie Dombroski - vocals (2020–present)

Discography 
Singles:

 Maggot Wind (2021)
Damned (2021)
Hair (2021)
Saddle Up and Ride (feat. Violent J) (2022)
Mumps (2022)
Risk Machine (2023)
Sweet Toof (feat. Violent J) (2023)

Albums:

 The Lucid (October 15, 2021)
EPs:
 Saddle Up and Ride (January 27, 2023)

References 

American rock music groups
Musical groups established in 2020
Musical quartets